Jesús Adalberto Neyra Magagna is a Peruvian actor, model, dancer and former football player of Italian descent most known for being a "Hero" in the first and third season of El Gran Show.

He is Gianella Neyra's brother.
He has studied acting with Michelle Danner in Los Angeles.

Filmography

Theatre
 A pie, descalzos ¡vamos! (2009) as San Francisco de Asís (Saint Francis of Assisi).
La zapatilla encantada (2010) as El príncipe.
 Las tremendas aventuras de la Capitana Gazpacho (2010) as Pompeyo.
West Side Story (2011) as Bernardo Nunez.
Hairspray (2012) as Link Larkin.
Romeo y Julieta (2013) as Mercucio.

References

1990 births
Peruvian male musical theatre actors
Peruvian people of Italian descent
Living people
People from Lima
Peruvian male television actors
Peruvian male models
Peruvian male dancers